West Pond may refer to: 

 West Pond (Big Moose, New York)
 West Pond (Five Ponds, New York)
 West Pond (Thendara, New York)